is a private women's junior college in Kyoto, Kyoto, Japan, established in 1962.

External links
 Official website 

Educational institutions established in 1962
Private universities and colleges in Japan
Universities and colleges in Kyoto Prefecture
Japanese junior colleges
1962 establishments in Japan